Namsos Hospital is a local hospital located in Namsos, Norway. Owned and operated by Nord-Trøndelag Hospital Trust, part of the Central Norway Regional Health Authority, it serves the district of Namdalen in Nord-Trøndelag, as well as Osen and Bindal.

The helipad measures .

References

Hospitals in Norway
Namsos
Trøndelag County Municipality
Heliports in Norway
Airports in Trøndelag
Hospitals established in 1848
1848 establishments in Norway